Wonyong Sung (born 1955) is a South Korean professor of electronic and information engineering at Seoul National University (SNU). Sung received his B.S. in engineering from SNU in 1978 and his M.S. in the same field from KAIST in 1980. After working for GoldStar for three years, he went on to the University of California, Santa Barbara for his Ph.D., which he completed in 1987. He was named a Fellow of the Institute of Electrical and Electronics Engineers (IEEE) in 2015 for "contributions to real-time signal processing systems".

References 

1955 births
Living people
Seoul National University alumni
KAIST alumni
University of California, Santa Barbara alumni
Academic staff of Seoul National University
Fellow Members of the IEEE